I-67 was a Kaidai-type cruiser submarine of the Imperial Japanese Navy.  A KD5 sub-class boat, she sank in a training accident in 1940.

Design and description
The submarines of the KD5 sub-class were improved versions of the preceding KD4 sub-class. They displaced  surfaced and  submerged. The boats had a diving depth of 

For surface running, the boats were powered by two  diesel engines, each driving one propeller shaft. When submerged each propeller was driven by a  electric motor. They could reach  on the surface and  underwater.

The boats were armed with six internal  torpedo tubes, four in the bow and two in the stern. They carried a total of 14 torpedoes. They were also armed with one  deck gun for combat on the surface, as well as a  anti-aircraft machinegun.

Construction and commissioning
I-67 was built by Mitsubishi at Kobe, Japan. Her keel was laid on 14 October 1929 and she was launched on 7 April 1931. She was completed and commissioned on 8 August 1932.

Service history
Upon commissioning, I-67 was attached to the Kure Naval District and assigned to submarine Division 30, in which she spent her entire career. When the submarine  was commissioned on 10 November 1932, she joined I-67 in Submarine Division 30, and that day the division was reassigned to the Sasebo Defense Division in the Sasebo Naval District. The submarine  joined I-66 and I-67 in Submarine Division 30 on 1 December 1932, and that day the division was reassigned to Submarine Squadron 1 in the 1st Fleet in the Combined Fleet.

Submarine Division 30 was reassigned to Submarine Squadron 2 in the 2nd Fleet in the Combined Fleet on 15 November 1933. On 27 September 1934, I-67 departed Ryojun, Manchukuo, in company with the submarines I-56, I-57, I-58, I-62, I-65, and I-66 to conduct a training cruise in the Tsingtao area off China. The nine submarines completed the cruise with their arrival at Sasebo on 5 October 1934.

Submarine Division 30 was reassigned to the Sasebo Guard Squadron in the Sasebo Naval District on 15 November 1934, and again to Submarine Squadron 2 in the 2nd Fleet on 15 November 1935. On 13 April 1936, I-67 got underway in company with I-65 and I-66 from Fukuoka, Japan, for a training cruise that took them to the Tsingtao area. The three submarines completed the cruise with their arrival at Sasebo on 22 April 1936. The three submarines put to sea from Mako in the Pescadores Islands on 4 August 1936 for a training cruise off Amoy, China. They returned to Mako on 6 September 1936.

I-67  was decommissioned and placed in reserve in the Sasebo Naval District on 1 December 1937 and shifted to Third Reserve in that district on 15 December 1938. She was recommissioned as a unit of Submarine Division 30 on 15 November 1939 and assigned to Submarine Squadron 4 in the 1st Fleet in the Combined Fleet.

Loss
In August 1940, I-67 deployed to the Bonin Islands to take part in a Combined Fleet exercise with the commander of Submarine Division 30 and an exercise judge on board in addition to her crew of 89. She was in the Pacific Ocean off the southern coast of Minamitorishima on 29 August 1940 when a seaplane from the seaplane carrier  approached. I-67 practiced a crash dive to avoid a mock attack by the plane. She never resurfaced, and sank with the loss of all 91 men on board. On 25 September 1940, the Imperial Japanese Navy officially declared all on board to be dead, and I-67 was stricken from the Navy list on 1 November 1940.

The cause of I-67′s loss remains unknown. During the post-accident investigation, the crew of Mizuho′s seaplane said they believed that they saw  submerge with a rear hatch still open. Investigators concluded that if she had submerged with the hatch open, rapid flooding would have occurred and caused her to sink quickly by the stern.

Notes

References
 雑誌「丸」編集部『ハンディ版 日本海軍艦艇写真集19巻』潜水艦伊号、光人社、1997年。
 勝目純也『日本海軍の潜水艦 - その系譜と戦歴全記録』大日本絵画、2010年。
 海軍歴史保存会『日本海軍史』第7巻、第9巻、第10巻、第一法規出版、1995年。
 外山操『艦長たちの軍艦史』光人社、2005年。  
 

1931 ships
Ships built by Mitsubishi Heavy Industries
Kaidai-class submarines
Maritime incidents in August 1940
Shipwrecks in the Pacific Ocean
Japanese submarine accidents
Lost submarines of Japan
Warships lost with all hands